Larry Panciera (October 11, 1921 – September 8, 1998) was an American college baseball coach at the University of Connecticut where he led the Huskies to three College World Series appearances in eighteen seasons. Panciera coached the Huskies from 1962 through 1979, finishing with a 297–160–5 overall record.

Early life
Panciera was born October 11, 1921 in Westerly, Rhode Island. He enrolled at Rhode Island State College in 1940, but joined the United States Army during World War II. After the war, he returned to college and played football and baseball for the Rhode Island Rams while completing his degree. After graduating, Panciera spent three years at Killingly High School in Danielson, Connecticut, serving as the school's first athletic director and coaching the football and baseball teams. Each team won state titles during his tenure.

Coaching career
In 1950, Panciera joined the staff of the Connecticut Huskies football team, as freshman coach. Four years later, he added assistant coach of the baseball team under head coach J. O. Christian before succeeding him in 1962. In his career as head baseball coach from 1962 through 1979, the Huskies reached three College World Series and saw 40 players sign professional contracts. Panciera owns the highest winning percentage of all baseball coaches at UConn. He died on September 8, 1998, after a prolonged illness.

Head coaching record
The following table shows Panciera's record as a head coach.

References

1921 births
1998 deaths
Rhode Island Rams baseball players
Rhode Island Rams football players
UConn Huskies baseball coaches
UConn Huskies football coaches
High school baseball coaches in the United States
High school football coaches in Connecticut
People from Westerly, Rhode Island
United States Army personnel of World War II